Patricia McNulty (born 1942) is an American former actress known for her appearances in 1960s television series.

McNulty had a recurring role in the sitcom television series My Three Sons with Fred MacMurray (1961–1967) and also appeared in Hazel, The Many Loves of Dobie Gillis, and Mr. Novak. She also played Yeoman Tina Lawton in an episode of the original Star Trek series ("Charlie X", 1966). McNulty was the wife of actor, Don Dorrell.

Partial filmography
Tammy Tell Me True (1961) - Joan
The House of God (1984) - Computer Technician (final film role)

References

External links
 

1945 births
Living people
American television actresses
20th-century American actresses
21st-century American women